Nicole Holofcener (born March 22, 1960) is an American film and television director and screenwriter. She has directed six feature films, including Walking and Talking, Friends with Money and Enough Said, as well as various television series.  Along with Jeff Whitty, Holofcener received a 2019 Academy Award nomination for Adapted Screenplay, a BAFTA  nomination for Best Adapted Screenplay, and won the Writers Guild of America Award for Best Adapted Screenplay for the film Can You Ever Forgive Me? (2018).

Life and career
Holofcener was born to a culturally Jewish family in New York City, the younger of two daughters of artist Lawrence Holofcener and set decorator Carol Joffe (née Shapiro). Her elder sister is Suzanne Holofcener. Nicole's parents divorced when she was a year old.  When she was eight, her mother married film producer Charles H. Joffe, who moved the family to Hollywood.

Since her stepfather produced Woody Allen's films, Holofcener spent enough time on Allen's sets to be an extra in Take the Money and Run and Sleeper. Joffe was responsible for Holofcener's first "real" job in the movie industry: a production assistant on Woody Allen's A Midsummer Night's Sex Comedy in 1982. She moved up to apprentice editor for Hannah and Her Sisters (1986).

Holofcener's first experiences with film as a child left her either frightened or sad; she recalled her fright at Jerry Lewis's The Nutty Professor. Holofcener originally wanted to become an artist like her father, but felt she wasn't as talented as others in her classes at Sonoma State University. From there, she gravitated into taking film courses. She studied film at the Tisch School of the Arts at New York University and at Columbia University, and made two shorts titled Angry and It's Richard I Love. While at Columbia, she was taught by Martin Scorsese.

After viewing one of her NYU films, her stepfather wondered aloud if she shouldn't make a career change. Disappointed, she became a clerk at a video store for a while, then entered Columbia's graduate film program. At the time of his death in 2008, Charles Joffe had become one of the most ardent fans of his stepdaughter's work. Angry received critical praise at Sundance. Holofcener has been viewed as an indie filmmaker despite the financial and critical success of her feature-length films. Many of the conventions of independent film are found in her movies. Many of Holofcener's films are shot on location during their production.

Much of Holofcener's work has a realistic style, but her films do not always have a typical plot structure and are sometimes obscure. Holofcener portrays typical, "everyday" middle-class people and their actions, like the characters in Please Give. Holofcener's films almost always feature a female character in the lead.

Feature film career
Holofcener made her feature film writing and directing debut in 1996 with Walking and Talking, which starred Catherine Keener, Anne Heche, Todd Field, Liev Schreiber, and Kevin Corrigan. The film was critically acclaimed. Her understanding of modern, professional women made her an ideal choice to direct female-centric television shows like Sex and the City, Leap of Faith and Gilmore Girls. Holofcener also worked on an episode of the U.S. adaptation of Cold Feet.

She followed in 2001 with her second feature, Lovely and Amazing. Featuring performances by Catherine Keener, Brenda Blethyn, Emily Mortimer and newcomer Raven Goodwin, the film was not only critically acclaimed but did well at the box office.

After directing two episodes of the series Six Feet Under, Holofcener began work on her third film, Friends with Money, which featured Jennifer Aniston, Joan Cusack, Frances McDormand, and Catherine Keener. The film opened the 2006 Sundance Film Festival, and its screenplay was nominated for the 2006 Independent Spirit Award, while McDormand won the award for Best Supporting Female. The film received a limited release on April 7, 2006.

Holofcener's fourth feature, Please Give, premiered at Sundance and was screened at the Berlin International Film Festival and the Tribeca Film Festival. The film also won Holofcener the Robert Altman Award. The film also gained Holofcener a nomination with the Writers Guild of America Awards for Best Original Screenplay. It stars Keener in the duo's fourth collaboration and was released in 2010. The film also features Oliver Platt, Rebecca Hall, Amanda Peet, and Sarah Steele.

Holofcener followed this up with Enough Said starring Julia Louis-Dreyfus, James Gandolfini, and Catherine Keener. The film premiered at the 2013 Toronto International Film Festival. The romantic comedy follows the character Eva, a recent divorcée. Eva falls in love unexpectedly and discovers her new love interest is the ex-husband of her friend. To date, Enough Said is Holofcener's most financially successful film. The film was officially released on September 20, 2013, a few months after Gandolfini's death.

In 2015, it was announced that Holofcener was set to direct an adaptation of Lee Israel's memoir Can You Ever Forgive Me?, with Julianne Moore in the lead role. However, later that year, Moore was fired by Holofcener, who would later leave her directing role. Eventually Melissa McCarthy was selected for the lead role. The film, ultimately directed by Marielle Heller, was well received by critics after being released on October 19, 2018, garnering Holofcener a nomination for the Academy Award for Best Adapted Screenplay, and a Writers Guild of America Award for Best Adapted Screenplay.

Amazon's One Mississippi featured Holofcener as the director for the pilot. The series was written by Tig Notaro and Diablo Cody. Notaro also starred in the series, which was produced by Louis C.K.

Filmography

Films

Acting

Television
Writer

Director

Acting

Awards and nominations

References

External links
 
 
  Article about Holofcener.
 

1960 births
American television directors
American television writers
American women film directors
American women television directors
Columbia University School of the Arts alumni
Living people
Writers from New York City
American women screenwriters
American women television writers
20th-century American Jews
Film directors from New York City
Screenwriters from New York (state)
21st-century American Jews
20th-century American women writers
21st-century American women writers
20th-century American screenwriters
21st-century American screenwriters